Honky is the ninth studio album by American rock band Melvins, released in 1997 through Amphetamine Reptile Records. It is widely considered to be the band's most experimental album. Their first studio album after being dropped from Atlantic, it contains a mixture of traditional Melvins-sounding rock, experiments with drones and soundscapes, and some rather uncharacteristic electronic pieces. A video was made for "Mombius Hibachi". The final track, "In the Freaktose the Bugs are Dying", concludes with more than 25 minutes of silence.

Background
In an interview, frontman Buzz Osborne said that album cost $3,000 to make, three days rehearsal, and six days recording. The project was an attempt to plug the gap after the major release of the previous album Stag under the Atlantic label. Joe Barresi was the engineer on the album.

The album's eight-minute plus opening track "They All Must Be Slaughtered" features co-lead vocals from Kat Bjelland of Babes in Toyland.

This is the last album to feature bassist Mark Deutrom.

In January 2011, Melvins played a series of four shows at Club Spaceland. A special handmade digipak edition of album was sold there, limited to 50 copies. This version had a typo in the album title, spelling it "Honkey".

Vinyl version
A vinyl version was also released by Amphetamine Reptile Records in a limited amount. The vinyl version splits the song "Air Breather Deep in the Arms of Morphius" into two parts due to limitations of the vinyl sides. The final song "In the Freaktose the Bugs Are Dying" omits the 25 minutes of silence.

Track listing

Personnel
King Buzzo – guitar, vocals
Mark D – bass, guitar
Dale C – drums
with
Katherine Bjelland – additional vocals (track 1)
Mac Mann – piano, bell and synthesizer
David Scott Stone – bowed cymbal and oscillators

Additional personnel
Joe Barresi – producer, engineer, mixing
Ryan Boesch – assistance
Mackie O – art and Polaroids

References

1997 albums
Amphetamine Reptile Records albums
Albums produced by Joe Barresi
Melvins albums